Riding the rail may refer to:

 Riding a rail, assaultive punishment by a mob
 Riding the rails, freighthopping
 Standing in the front row at a music event.

See also 
 Riding the rods, and "riding a rod", former forms of freighthopping, by riding undercarriage of railroad car